A gender neutral title is a title that does not indicate the gender identity, whatever it may be, of the person being formally addressed. Honorifics are used in situations when it is inappropriate to refer to someone only by their first or last name, such as when addressing a letter, or when introducing the person to others. By comparison, the traditional honorifics of Miss, Mrs, Ms and Mr all indicate the binary gender of the individual.

These titles are used to avoid specifying gender for:
 persons who wish not to indicate a gender (binary or otherwise) 
 persons for whom the gender is not known
persons whose biological sex is not on the gender binary (intersex)
 persons whose gender identity does not fit the gender binary
Activists, supporters and groups such as the Trans Educators Network, The Trevor Project, and GLAAD are working toward awareness and acceptance of alternative honorifics, including Mx.

Gender neutral titles

Mx

Mx is a title commonly used by non-binary people as well as those who do not identify with the gender binary, and first appeared in print in the 1970s.

The "x" is intended to stand as a wildcard character, and does not imply a "mixed" gender. Pronunciation of "Mx" is not yet standardized; it is frequently pronounced "mix" but sometimes with a schwa as "məx", or even as "em-ex".

Ind.
Ind, which stands for individual.

M 
M is the first letter of most gendered titles, both masculine and feminine. The title "M" simply removes the following letters that would designate gender.

Misc 
Misc, which stands for miscellaneous.

Other titles 
Dr, referring to one who has obtained a PhD, MD, or other doctorate-level degree. While not available for all, many non-binary people who have achieved such schooling prefer to use this title as it does not inherently indicate any one gender. 

Mre, short for the word "mystery". 

Msr, a combination of "Miss", a feminine title, and "Sir", which is typically masculine. 

Pr, short for the word "person", pronounced "per".

History

Origins 
"Mx" was first used in print in 1977, and it is unknown whether there was spoken usage before that. There is some confusion surrounding when Mx became a common way for persons to prefer to be addressed, however, there have been numerous cases of Mx in print from 1977 up until the early 2000's, when usage became more popular. The Oxford and Merriam-Webster English Dictionaries added Mx in 2015 and 2016, respectively.

Professional/military titles 
In many cases, gender-non-conforming individuals have used professional titles such as Captain, Doctor, or Coach to avoid gendered titles. This practice is seen in the media, frequently in the case of women attempting to avoid the discrimination associated with femininity in professional settings.

See also 
English honorifics
Honorific
San (Japanese honorific)
Ssi (Korean honorific)
Title

References

Gender-neutral language
Honorifics